Arthur Ingram (ca. 1565 – 1642) was an English politician.

Arthur Ingram may also refer to:

Arthur Ingram, 3rd Viscount of Irvine (1666–1702), English Member of Parliament and peer
Arthur Ingram, 6th Viscount of Irvine (1689–1736), British landowner and politician
Arthur B. Ingram, Virginia and Iowa legislator

See also
Arthur Winnington-Ingram (1858-1946), Bishop of London
Arthur Winnington-Ingram (Archdeacon of Hereford) (1888-1965)